Ryoma Tanaka (born 28 December 2001) is a Japanese judoka.

He is the gold medallist of the 2021 Judo Grand Slam Paris in the -66 kg category. He won one of the bronze medals in his event at the 2022 Judo Grand Slam Paris held in Paris, France.

References

External links
 

2001 births
Living people
Japanese male judoka
21st-century Japanese people